is a Shingon sect Buddhist temple located outside of Atsugi, Kanagawa Prefecture, Japan.

It is the 6th temple in the Bandō Sanjūsankasho pilgrimage circuit of 33 Buddhist temples in the Kantō region of eastern Japan to the goddess Kannon.

History
According to temple legend, Hase-dera was founded by either the wandering holy ascetic Gyōki around 725 AD, or the famed prelate Kūkai from 810-835 AD. However, no historical documents have survived to substantiate this legend, and the history of the temple is thus uncertain. During the Kamakura period, the temple was a center for ecumenical studies linking the Shingon sect with the Tendai, Ritsu and Zen sects, along with Kakuon-ji in Kamakura and Shōmyo-ji in Mutsuura.  At present, the temple belongs to the Kōyasan Shingon sect of Japanese Buddhism.

The temple's Main Hall dates from the Edo period and houses the honzon bronze Juichimen Kannon Bosatsu. The temple is also noted for its sakura in spring.

Buddhist temples in Kanagawa Prefecture
Shingon Buddhism
Kōyasan Shingon temples